The men's decathlon at the 2014 European Athletics Championships took place at the Letzigrund on 12 and 13 August.

Medalists

Records

Schedule

Results

100 metres
Wind: Heat 1: -1.1 m/s m/s, Heat 2: -0.9 m/s, Heat 3: -1.9 m/s

Long jump

Shot put

High jump

400 metres

110 metres hurdles

Wind:Heat 1: +0.1 m/s, Heat 2: +0.6 m/s, Heat 3: +0.5 m/s

Discus throw

Pole vault

Javelin throw

1500 metres

Final standings

References

Decathlon M
Combined events at the European Athletics Championships